Sir William Henry Bailey (10 May 1838 – 22 November 1913) was a British engineer, businessman and local politician, knighted by Queen Victoria for his work on the creation of the Manchester Ship Canal.

Bailey was born on 10 May 1838 in Salford, England to John Bailey and Elizabeth Ann Bailey.

He was involved in the local politics of the Borough of Salford, being first an alderman, and later elected Mayor of the borough in 1893.

He was knighted by Queen Victoria on the royal yacht in 1894 on the occasion of Her Majesty opening the Manchester Ship Canal. Sir William was one of the promoters of the Canal, and was a member of the Provisional Committee.

Bailey died in London on 22 November 1913.

References

External links
 William H. Bailey at Grace's Guides of British Industrial History

1838 births
1913 deaths
Mayors of Salford
Engineers from Greater Manchester
Manchester Literary and Philosophical Society
Knights Bachelor